Tha Sak is a village and tambon (sub-district) of Phichai District, in Uttaradit Province, Thailand. In 2005 it had a population of 7,323 people. The tambon contains 10 villages.

References

Tambon of Uttaradit province
Populated places in Uttaradit province